Silsila is a 1981 Indian Hindi-language romantic drama film co-written, directed, and produced by Yash Chopra. The story revolves around the love triangle of Amit (Amitabh Bachchan), a romantic playwright, Shobha (Jaya Bachchan), his wife, and Chandni (Rekha), his former partner. Silsila follows the incidents faced by Amit and Shobha in their marriage of sacrifice and Amit's extramarital affair with Chandni. The soundtrack was composed by Shiv–Hari, with lyrics from Javed Akhtar, Hasan Kamal, Meera Dev Burman, Nida Fazli, Rajendra Krishan, and Harivansh Rai Bachchan.

Silsila attracted considerable attention from the media when it was in production due to its casting. Principal photography took place in Amsterdam, Bombay (now Mumbai), Delhi, and  Kashmir from November 1980 and May 1981. The film, however, failed at the box office after premiered on 14 August 1981, grossing only . At the 29th Filmfare Awards, the film received nominations for Best Actor (Amitabh Bachchan), Best Actress (Jaya Bachchan), and Best Music Director (Shiv–Hari). Critically, it received negative notice for the story and the cast's performances.

Plot
Orphaned at a young age, the brothers Shekhar and Amit Malhotra enjoy a close relationship but live independently. Shekhar is a squadron leader in the Indian Air Force, while Amit is a Delhi-based romantic playwright. Shekhar introduces Amit to his fiancée, Shobha, and the three form a camaraderie. Amit, in turn, meets Chandni and their relationship blossoms into love with hopes of marriage. Before Amit is able to introduce Chandni to Shekhar, Shekhar dies in the Indo-Pakistani War of 1971. Shobha is subsequently revealed to be pregnant with Shekhar's child. Devastated from the loss of Shekhar, Amit marries Shobha to shield her from societal scorn and the stigma of being an unwed mother, and to honor Shekhar's memory. He sends a letter to Chandni ending their relationship, professing his love but urging her to move on, leaving Chandni heartbroken.

Tragedy strikes once more when Amit and Shobha are injured in a car accident and Shobha suffers a miscarriage. She is treated by Dr. V.K. Anand, who in a plot twist is revealed to have married Chandni. Without a child to bind them together, Amit and Shobha settle into their passionless marriage. Amit befriends Dr. Anand in an attempt to rekindle his romance with Chandni, who eventually gives in. They meet secretly, although not without arousing the suspicions of Shobha, who despite her history with Shekhar has come to love revere Amit. On the way home from a tryst one night, Amit and Chandni injure a pedestrian with their car. Their affair is endangered when the policeman investigating the accident happens to be Shobha's cousin, who is protective of Shobha and intends to expose Amit.

Amit decides to leave his loveless marriage to be with Chandni. The news shatters Shobha, who has genuinely fallen for Amit but believes that her love will make him return. Dr. Anand is also aware of Chandni's infidelity and feels devastated. When Dr. Anand leaves on a business trip, Amit and Chandni secretly leave town to start a new life. Anand's plane, however, crashes and causes them to rush to the wreckage site. There, Amit is confronted by Shobha, who reveals that she is expecting his child. After Anand is rescued, Chandni realizes her love for her husband and returns to him. The film ends with Amit and Shobha living happily in their marriage.

Cast
Cast adapted from Rotten Tomatoes:
 Shashi Kapoor as Shekhar Malhotra
 Amitabh Bachchan as Amit Malhotra
 Jaya Bachchan as Shobha Malhotra
 Rekha as Chandni
 Sanjeev Kumar as Dr. V. K. Anand
 Sudha Chopra as Shobha's mother
 Sushma Seth as Amit's benefactor
 Kulbhushan Kharbanda as police officer Kulbhushan, Shobha's cousin (guest appearance)
 Deven Verma as Vidyarthi (guest appearance)

Production
Silsila was directed and produced by Yash Chopra for his banner Yash Raj Films. He co-wrote the screenplay with Sagar Sarhadi, who also co-wrote the story with Preeti Bedi. According to Sarhadi, Chopra "fell madly in love with the subject". The dialogue was written by Romesh Sharma. The film is about an extramarital relationship, the first time for a Hindi-language film; after he failed with action films, Chopra had decided to make a romantic film for his next venture.

Chopra's biographer Rachel Dwyer described the casting as complicated, for which the film was controversial before release. Speculations about the relationship between Amitabh Bachchan, who was married to Jaya Bachchan, and Rekha was common in gossip magazines and newspapers at the time. Chopra called his ability to cast the three his greatest achievement. He initially considered Parveen Babi and Smita Patil for Rekha's and Jaya Bachchan's parts, respectively, but abandoned the plans owing to their unsuitability in playing their respective roles. On the recommendations of Amitabh Bachchan, who had agreed to star in the film in 1980, Chopra subsequently replaced them with Rekha and Jaya Bachchan. Rekha designed her own costumes and jewellery. This was her final collaboration with Amitabh Bachchan.

Silsila was shot by Raju Kaygee. Filming was done from November 1980 to May 1981, starting in Kashmir and later Amsterdam, Bombay (now Mumbai), and Delhi. Wanting no exposure from the media, Chopra did the filming privately with the entire cast and crew. He described the production as "real life coming into reel life" but said that there are no incidents on the sets and all the lead actors were co-operative. The Delhi schedule sometimes took place at 5.30 PM when the weather was cold; Rekha recounted how she hated it and that she did so only for Chopra. The film, edited by Keshav Naidu, runs for 166 minutes. Hariprasad Chaurasia and Shivkumar Sharma provided the background score.

Music
The soundtrack to the film, released by Saregama on 18 May 1981, was composed by Shiv–Hari. The lyrics were by Javed Akhtar, Hasan Kamal, Meera Dev Burman, Nida Fazli, Rajendra Krishan, and Harivansh Rai Bachchan. "Yeh Kahan Aa Gaye Hum" was one of the songs sung by Lata Mangeshkar in her concert "Lata Live". Akhtar, who previously collaborated with Salim Khan in screenwriting, turned to lyrical composition and "Dekha Ek Khwab" was his first written song. Akhtar was chosen after Chopra hearing his poetry and being astonished by it. "Rang Barse Bhige Chunar Wali" became one of the most-played songs in the Holi celebration.

Release and reception 
Silsila was released on 14 August 1981 and failed at the box office, which Chopra believed due to the audience's attentions mostly given to the controversy, resulted by the casting, rather than the plot. Around a week later, a screening was held at the Mumbai Metro and collected , with  being donated to the Nargis Dutt Foundation. Sunil Sethi of India Today criticized the cliché storyline and called the cast uninteresting. In his review, Sethi concluded,

 "But Silsila itself is pure polyester yarn. It's a lot less real than the so-called dirty, distorted and damaging stories that appear in the gossip press which the stars claim are so distressing. At least they read better, look better and may be include half-truths here and there. Silsila looks good, too, but is a distortion of half-lies, which is worse."

Dwyer wrote that Amitabh Bachchan's then-popular screen persona as an "angry young man", which he got from Deewaar (1975), was incompatible with his role in Silsila as a lover. The film received three nominations at the 29th Filmfare Awards: Best Actor (Amitabh Bachchan), Best Actress (Jaya Bachchan), and Best Music Director (Shiv–Hari). It marked the beginning of the setback in Chopra's career; in spite of this, he called Silsila one of his favourite films in a 2011 interview.

References

External links 
 
 Silsila at Bollywood Hungama

1981 films
1980s Hindi-language films
1981 romantic drama films
Films directed by Yash Chopra
Films scored by Shiv-Hari
Yash Raj Films films
Films about adultery in India
Indian romantic drama films
Indian aviation films
Films shot in Amsterdam
Films shot in Delhi
Films shot in Mumbai